Nawab of Junagarh or Junagadh refers to the now defunct ex-lineage of rulers of the princely Junagarh State in British Raj, nowadays Junagadh district in the state of Gujarat in India. There are still several forts and palaces in India which were owned by princely Junagarh family but after Partition of India, this property was claimed by the Indian Government.

List of Nawabs of Junagarh

Given below is the list of Nawabs who ruled in the princely Junagarh State before the Partition of India. After the independence of India and Pakistan in 1947, the title of Nawab of Junagarh has no official status. It still carries respect in Pakistan and is used as a courtesy title.

Last Nawab
The Partition of India in 1947 resulted in the exile of Nawab Muhammad Mahabat Khanji III, who was the last ruling Nawab of Junagadh. The Nawab, being Muslim, was in favor of declaring the state as part of newly created Muslim majority Pakistan. For this purpose he signed the documents for incorporation of its state in Pakistan, in response rulers of two states that were subject to the suzerainty of Junagadh—Mangrol and Babariawad—reacted by declaring their independence from Junagadh and acceding to India. In response, the Nawab of Junagadh militarily occupied the states, Sardar Patel saw this as an aggression upon State of India and called for military response. However, Jawaharlal Nehru waited to first establish the validity of accession of principality of Babariawad to India. Once this was established with Lord Mountbatten, on 22 September 1947, they sent a telegram to Dewan of Junagadh clarifying the legality of accession and to withdraw their troops from Babariawad. Further, Indian Army was ordered to go to Babariawad and get the territories in India's possession. The Nawab of Junagadh refused to vacate his troops from Babariawad and Mangrol. In October, 1947 Nawab of Junagarh fled with his family to Pakistan. The Indian Army finally entered and liberated Babariawad in November 1947 and stood on alert along borders of Junagadh and Mangrol for further orders. leading to the integration of Junagadh into. After his exile, he settled down in Pakistan and the Junagarh family resides at the 'Junagarh House' in Karachi, Pakistan.

After one year under Indian administration the Indian Government held a referendum asking the people of state to agree to be part of India.

See also
 Pathans of Gujarat
List of Sunni dynasties
Babi dynasty
 Babai (Pashtun tribe)
 List of Pashtun empires and dynasties

References

External links
 Official Website of State of Junagadh

Nawabs of India
Junagadh district
History of Gujarat
Mughal Empire
Junagadh